Pieter Bast (ca 1550 – 17 March 1605) was a Dutch cartographer, engraver and draftsman.

Early life
Bast was born in Antwerp, and was the child of Josyntje Plantin, who was part of the famous printer Plantin family. On 31 August 1601 he married Aryaentje Geryt Schaecken in Leiden. The following year he bought a house next to the Latin School.

Career
Pieter Bast engraved maps and cityscapes of Dutch cities. He worked on a map of Emden. He also worked as a surveyor. The most famous of his works was the map of Amsterdam that he drew and engraved in 1599. It covered a total of four blades and is titled Amstelodamum, Hollandiae urbs primaria, emporium Totius Europae celeberrimum. Since 1544 there was no accurate city map of Amsterdam, so this work has historical significance. The map was published on 1 October 1599 by bookseller-publisher Harmen Allartz or Alardi. The card was signed Petr. Bast Au (ie auctor) et sculp (sit) et excudebat, 1599, which indicates that Pieter Bast was also editor.

Later career
Pieter Bast made further engravings of Middelburg, Dordrecht, Leeuwarden, Franeker, Leiden, and Utrecht. He also made engravings of historical events such as the siege and the capture of Nijmegen as part of the Dutch Revolt by Maurice, Prince of Orange on 14 October 1591, the Battle of Nieuwpoort. Other artists he collaborated with include Floris Balthasar and Johan Sems. He was buried in St. Peter's Church in Leiden.

References
 Marijke Donkersloot-de Vrij: Register of Dutch cartographers 1500-1900, Utrecht 2003

1550s births
1605 deaths
16th-century Dutch cartographers
Dutch engravers
Scientists from Antwerp
16th-century Dutch artists